Houtteville is a former commune in the Manche department in north-western France. On 1 January 2016, it was merged into the commune of Picauville.

Heraldry

See also
Communes of the Manche department

References

Former communes of Manche